Enrico Montesano (born 7 June 1945) is an Italian actor and showman.

Career 

Montesano comes from a family involved in theatre, and he made his debut in 1966 in a show named Humor nero, alongside of Vittorio Metz. Later he became a very popular actor both on theatre and on television, thanks to his burlesque and brilliant style, and so during seventies he took part in several Italian comedies. He is probably best known for the role of Armando "Er Pomata" Pellicci in the cult movie Febbre da cavallo (1976), directed by Steno, but also for the role of Caleb, the good thief from Il ladrone (1980), directed by Pasquale Festa Campanile. Montesano won a David di Donatello as best new director for the movie A me mi piace (1985), in which he is both actor and director. His career continue from 1967 to 2010.

Personal life 

Montesano is married to Teresa Trisorio. He is the father of six children: from a previous marriage (to Tamara Moltrasio) he has two sons and one daughter (Tommaso, Oliver, Lavinia); another son (Mattia) was born to him by a longtime fiancée, Marina Spadaro; and two more (Enrico Michele, and Marco Valerio) he has by his present wife. He is an avid fan of the football team S.S. Lazio. 

In late 2022 he was disqualified from RAI's Dancing with the Stars show after pictures posted from a audition showed him wearing a shirt with a symbol and motto of the Decima MAS unit that was active in the Nazi-Fascist Salò republic puppet-state under Nazi-German occupation and committed some of the most serious [[[crimes]]s in wartime Italy by systematically carrying out public executions, massacres of civilian towns, torture, rapes and also assisting the Nazi genocide by assisting the German SS in round-ups and "punishment operations" against civilians.

Filmography 

 1967: Stasera mi butto directed by Ettore Maria Fizzarotti
 1967: Io non protesto, io amo directed by Ferdinando Baldi
 1967: Nel sole directed by Aldo Grimaldi
 1968: L'oro del mondo directed by Aldo Grimaldi
 1968: Donne, botte e bersaglieri directed by Ruggero Deodato
 1969: I quattro del pater noster directed by Ruggero Deodato
 1969: Zum zum zum - La canzone che mi passa per la testa directed by Bruno Corbucci and Sergio Corbucci
 1970: Io non scappo... fuggo directed by Franco Prosperi
 1971: Io non vedo, tu non parli, lui non sente directed by Mario Camerini
 1971: Io non spezzo... rompo directed by Bruno Corbucci
 1971: Il furto è l'anima del commercio...?! directed by Bruno Corbucci
 1972: Il terrore con gli occhi storti directed by Steno
 1972: Cause of Divorce directed by Marcello Fondato
 1972: Boccaccio directed by Bruno Corbucci
 1972: Il prode Anselmo e il suo scudiero directed by Bruno Corbucci
 1973: La signora è stata violentata! directed by Vittorio Sindoni
 1975: Amore vuol dir gelosia directed by Mauro Severino
 1976: L'Italia s'è rotta directed by Steno
 1976: Febbre da cavallo directed by Steno
 1976: Remo e Romolo - Storia di due figli di una lupa directed by Castellacci and Pingitore
 1976: Spogliamoci così, senza pudor directed by Sergio Martino
 1976: 40 gradi all'ombra del lenzuolo directed by Sergio Martino
 1976: Tutti possono arricchire tranne i poveri directed by Mauro Severino
 1977: Stato interessante directed by Sergio Nasca
 1977: Il marito in collegio directed by Maurizio Lucidi
 1977: Tre tigri contro tre tigri directed by Sergio Corbucci and Steno
 1977: Pane, burro e marmellata directed by Giorgio Capitani
 1977: Melodrammore directed by Maurizio Costanzo
 1977: Nerone directed by Castellacci and Pingitore
 1978: Tutto suo padre directed by Maurizio Lucidi
 1978: Le braghe del padrone directed by Flavio Mogherini
 1978: Io tigro, tu tigri, egli tigra directed by Giorgio Capitani
 1979: Amore in prima classe directed by Salvatore Samperi
 1979: Aragosta a colazione directed by Giorgio Capitani
 1980: Odio le bionde directed by Giorgio Capitani
 1980: Qua la mano directed by Pasquale Festa Campanile
 1980: Il ladrone directed by Pasquale Festa Campanile
 1981: Quando la coppia scoppia (anche soggetto) directed by Steno
 1981: Culo e camicia directed by Pasquale Festa Campanile
 1981: Camera d'albergo directed by Mario Monicelli
 1982: Il paramedico directed by Sergio Nasca
 1982: Più bello di così si muore directed by Pasquale Festa Campanile
 1982: Grand Hotel Excelsior directed by Castellano & Pipolo
 1982: Il conte Tacchia directed by Sergio Corbucci
 1983: Sing Sing directed by Sergio Corbucci
 1984: Mi faccia causa directed by Steno
 1984: Sotto... sotto... strapazzato da anomala passione directed by Lina Wertmüller
 1984: I due carabinieri directed by Carlo Verdone
 1985: A me mi piace directed by Enrico Montesano
 1986: Grandi magazzini directed by Castellano & Pipolo
 1986: Il tenente dei carabinieri directed by Maurizio Ponzi
 1987: Noi uomini duri directed by Maurizio Ponzi
 1988: Il volpone directed by Maurizio Ponzi
 1988: I picari directed by Mario Monicelli
 1991: Piedipiatti (anche soggetto) directed by Carlo Vanzina
 1993: Cain vs. Cain directed by Alessandro Benvenuti
 1994: Anche i commercialisti hanno un'anima directed by Maurizio Ponzi
 2002: Febbre da cavallo - La mandrakata directed by Carlo Vanzina
 2007: Il lupo directed by Stefano Calvagna
 2008: Bastardi directed by Federico Del Zoppo and Andres Alce Meldonado
 2009: Many Kisses Later directed by Fausto Brizzi
 2010: Tutto l'amore del mondo directed by Riccardo Grandi
 2019: Vivere directed by Francesca Archibugi

References 

1945 births
Living people
Italian male film actors
Italian male comedians
David di Donatello winners
Nastro d'Argento winners
20th-century Italian male actors
21st-century Italian male actors
Italian male stage actors
Italian male television actors